The railway from Strasbourg to Basel is a French and Swiss 141.3-kilometre long railway line. It is used for passenger (express, regional and suburban) and freight traffic. The railway was opened in 1840–1844. It was the first railway line to serve Switzerland.

Main stations
 Gare de Strasbourg
 Gare de Colmar
 Gare de Mulhouse
 Basel SNCF and Basel SBB railway station

Line history
The concession for the railway Strasbourg–Basel was granted to the Compagnie du chemin de fer de Strasbourg à Bâle, founded by the Koechlin brothers, in 1838. The first sections that were opened in 1840 led from Benfeld to Colmar, and from Mulhouse to Saint-Louis near the Swiss border. In 1841 Koenigshoffen (near Strasbourg) and Benfeld were connected, and Colmar was connected to Mulhouse. Finally in 1844 the sections between Strasbourg and Koenigshoffen, and between Saint-Louis and the Swiss border were opened. The assets of the Compagnie du chemin de fer de Strasbourg à Bâle were bought by the Chemins de fer de l'Est in 1854. On June 15, 1860, the line was extended south to Basel Centralbahnhof (now Basel SBB), its present terminus.

Keeping right
The line was, from the start, planned and opened as a double track route, with trains travelling on the right.   It had been intended to switch to running the trains on the left side of the double track once the line had been extended and connected with the main Paris-Strasburg line, but this was not done.   After the transfer of Alsace into Germany in 1870, the region's railways were integrated into the German rail network, where travelling on the right-hand track of any double track was already standard procedure, so there was no longer any pressure for railways to switch to the French convention of running trains on the lefthand track.   In 1919 and again in 1945 the region reverted to French control, but on the Strasburg-Basel line, as in the rest of Alsace where twin tracks are involved, trains continue to travel on the right.

References

Strasbourg - Basel
Cross-border railway lines in France
Cross-border railway lines in Switzerland
France–Switzerland border
Railway lines opened in 1844